Influence  or influencer may refer to:

Social influence, in social psychology, influence in interpersonal relationships
Minority influence, when the minority affect the behavior or beliefs of the majority
Influencer marketing, through individuals that have influence over potential buyers

Science and technology
Sphere of influence (astrodynamics), the region around a celestial body in which it is the primary gravitational influence on orbiting objects
Sphere of influence (black hole), a region around a black hole in which the gravity of the black hole dominates that of the host galaxy's bulge

Politics
Undue influence, in contract law, where one person takes advantage of a position of power over another person
Sphere of influence, in political science, an area over which a state or organization has some indirect control
Agent of influence, an agent of some stature who uses his or her position to influence public opinion or decision making to produce results beneficial to the country whose intelligence service operates the agent
Office of Strategic Influence, a short-lived U.S. government department

Film, television and theatre
Influence (film), a 2020 Canadian/South African documentary
The Influence (2010 film), a South Korean film
The Influence (2019 film), a Spanish horror film 
La influencia (2007 film), or The Influence, a Spanish drama film 
Influence (play), a 2005 play by David Williamson
"Influence" (The Good Doctor), a 2020 TV episode
"Influence" (Law & Order: Special Victims Unit), a 2006 TV episode

Music
Influence (band), a rock band formed in the 1960s

Albums
 The Influence (album), an album by jazz artist Jimmy Raney.
 Influences (album), a 1984 album by Mark King
 Influence (Ardijah album), a 1996 album by the New Zealand group Ardijah
 Influence (Sister Machine Gun album), a 2003 album by Sister Machine Gun
 Influence, a 1992 album by Little Caesar

Songs
"Influence", a song by Tove Lo from Lady Wood
"Influence" (Sister Machine Gun song), a song by Sister Machine Gun from the album Influence (Sister Machine Gun album)
Influencer (song), a 2017 single from Japanese group Nogizaka46

Other uses
Driving under the influence, the criminal act of driving while intoxicated
Influence: Science and Practice, and Influence: The Psychology of Persuasion; two books by Robert Cialdini
The Influence (Monhegan, Maine), a house in the United States

See also

Persuasion
Manipulation (disambiguation)
 Influenza (disambiguation)